The white-cheeked tern (Sterna repressa) is a species of tern in the family Laridae.
It is found around the coasts on the Red Sea, around the Horn of Africa to Kenya, in the Persian Gulf and along the Iranian coast to Pakistan and western India.

Behaviour
Most of this species is migratory, although those in East Africa may remain there all year. It breeds in colonies of 10–200 pairs. These colonies can consist of a mixture of tern species.

Habitat
The species inhabits tropical coasts and inshore waters, foraging mainly within  of land over coral reefs. Its nest is a shallow scrape on rock, sand, gravel or coral islands, bare and exposed sandflats and sparsely vegetated open ground on sand-dunes and above the high-water mark on beaches.

Diet
Its diet consists of invertebrates and small fish.

References 

white-cheeked tern
Birds of East Africa
Birds of the Middle East
white-cheeked tern
Taxonomy articles created by Polbot